Nikolay Ivanov Rusev -"The Jangur"(born 26 August 1956 in Nesebar, Bulgaria) is a Bulgarian former football midfielder and currently Head of Youth Academy of Nesebar.   He is most famous for having played for Nesebar and Chernomorets Burgas.

Career
Rusev was born in Nesebar and started to play football at his hometown club Nesebar. He was promoted into the first team in 1972. He was transferred to Chernomorets Burgas in the 1981–82 season and scored 25 goals for the club. In 1983, Rusev moved to Anagennisi Dherynia. In his career he also played for APEP. He finished his career at his first club PFC Nesebar in 1995.

Honours
 Bulgarian Cup runner-up: 1989
 Bulgarian Supercup runner-up: 1989

Coaching career
After retiring in 1995, Rusev pursued a career as a coach. In July, 2001, he was appointed as a manager in his hometown club Nesebar. In 2008, he became a youth coach at the club. He had been appointed on 29 May 2010 again as a manager of PFC Nesebar to replace Georgi Vasilev who left after loss the play-off against Akademik Sofia with a result of 1:2 for promotion to the A PFG. On 18 June 2017, Rusev was replaced by Nikolay Zhechev and moved to a new role, Youth Academy director.

References

1956 births
Bulgarian football managers
Bulgarian footballers
Bulgarian expatriate footballers
Expatriate footballers in Cyprus
First Professional Football League (Bulgaria) players
Cypriot First Division players
Cypriot Second Division players
PFC Nesebar players
FC Chernomorets Burgas players
APEP FC players
Anagennisi Deryneia FC players
Living people
 Association football midfielders
People from Burgas Province